Gowers's sign is a medical sign that indicates weakness of the proximal muscles, namely those of the lower limb.  The sign describes a patient that has to use their hands and arms to "walk" up their own body from a squatting position due to lack of hip and thigh muscle strength.

It is named after William Richard Gowers.


Associations
Gowers's sign is classically seen in Duchenne muscular dystrophy where it is mostly evident at 4–6 years, but also presents itself in centronuclear myopathy, myotonic dystrophy and various other conditions associated with proximal muscle weakness, including Becker muscular dystrophy, dermatomyositis and Pompe disease. For this maneuver, the patient is placed on the floor away from any objects that could otherwise be used to pull oneself to a standing position. It is also used in testing paraplegia.

See also
 Spinal muscular atrophy

References

Symptoms and signs: musculoskeletal system
Muscular dystrophy
Symptoms and signs: Nervous system